Lil' Ainjil is a 1936 short animated film distributed by Columbia Pictures, and features Krazy Kat.

Overview
Unlike the Krazy Kat films of the Winkler and Columbia period, animator Isidore Klein attempted to create Lil' Ainjil in the milieu of George Herriman's comic strips. However, the film was not well received by critics, prompting the series to revert to their current setting.

Plot
Offissa Pupp and Mrs. Kwakk Wakk are walking down the road, talking about one's own livelihood. On the way, they find Krazy sticking his head inside a small theater box. On the other side of the box, Ignatz the mouse is tossing bricks at Krazy's head but the cat appears to be enjoying it. The suspicious Offissa Pupp goes around and eventually notices the reality before arresting Ignatz.

Offissa Pupp imprisons Ignatz and walks away in celebration. Despite Ignatz's malicious treatment, Krazy feels sorry and decides to break the rodent out of the slammer. The naïve cat offers Ignatz a pie which conceals carpentry tools. Ignatz uses the tools to demolish the prison to the ground. But in doing so, another criminal is released.

That other criminal runs into the open and begins harassing the Mrs. Kwakk Wakk. Offissa Pupp struggles to intervene. For some reason, Ignatz decides to help out the Offissa Pupp by taking a machine gun and firing it at the criminal. The criminal is taken down, and Mrs. Kwakk Wakk is safe.

Though he escaped prison, Ignatz, nonetheless, receives a handshake from the Offissa Pupp for the assistance. As they go their separate ways, Ignatz sees Krazy joyously dancing around. He finds a square rock and throws it at Krazy, knocking the cat unconscious. Offissa Pupp, who is not too faraway, saw the deed, and chases Ignatz into the horizon.

Notes
The name of the short would become the catchphrase Krazy says in the 1960s TV series after every time the feline gets hit by a brick thrown by Ignatz Mouse.
The short is available in the Columbia Cartoon Collection: Volume 8

See also
 Krazy Kat filmography

References

 Maltin, Leonard (1987). Of Mice and Magic: A History of American Animated Cartoons. Penguin Books. .
Columbia Cartoons - The Columbia Shorts Department

External links
Lil' Ainjil at the Big Cartoon Database
Lil' Ainjil on YouTube

1936 short films
American animated short films
American black-and-white films
1936 animated films
Krazy Kat shorts
Columbia Pictures short films
1930s American animated films
Columbia Pictures animated short films
Films about mice and rats
Screen Gems short films